Iñigo Muñoz Cuevas (born 16 December 1996) is a Spanish professional footballer who plays as a right winger for Cultural y Deportiva Leonesa.

Club career
Born in Bilbao, Biscay, Basque Country, Muñoz made his senior debut with JD Somorrostro in the regional leagues. On 15 June 2016, he signed for Gernika Club of Segunda División B.

Muñoz made his senior debut on 21 August 2016, starting in a 2–1 away loss against UD San Sebastián de los Reyes. He scored his first goal six days later, his team's third in the 4–1 home win over CDA Navalcarnero.

On 30 March 2017, Muñoz agreed to a two-year contract with La Liga club Athletic Bilbao, which was made effective on 1 July; he was initially assigned to the reserves also in the third division. He played his first competitive match with the main squad on 25 October, coming on as a second-half substitute for Ager Aketxe in a 1–1 draw at SD Formentera in the round of 32 of the Copa del Rey.

After helping CD Castellón return to the Segunda División after ten years at the end of 2019–20, Muñoz made only one official appearance in the first part of the following season. He returned to the third tier in the 2021 January transfer window, joining Unionistas de Salamanca CF.

References

External links
Castellón official profile 

1996 births
Living people
Spanish footballers
Footballers from Bilbao
Association football wingers
Segunda División B players
Primera Federación players
Divisiones Regionales de Fútbol players
Danok Bat CF players
Gernika Club footballers
Bilbao Athletic footballers
Athletic Bilbao footballers
CD Castellón footballers
Unionistas de Salamanca CF players